Torocca is a genus of flies in the family Tachinidae.

Species
Torocca abdominalis Walker, 1859
Torocca fasciata (Townsend, 1919)
Torocca kloofia (Townsend, 1927)
Torocca munda (Walker, 1856)
Torocca pollinosa Crosskey, 1963

References

Dexiinae
Taxa named by Francis Walker (entomologist)
Diptera of Australasia
Diptera of Asia
Tachinidae genera